Royal Air Force Broadwell or more simply RAF Broadwell is a former Royal Air Force station located 2 miles north of Broadwell and 3 miles southeast of Burford, Oxfordshire, and within 2 miles of RAF Brize Norton.

It opened on 15 November 1943, operating under RAF Transport Command, and closed on 31 March 1947. It had three concrete runways in a triangular configuration.

History

No. 512 Squadron and No. 575 Squadron were based here, flying the Douglas Dakota.

In February 1944, No. 512 Squadron was transferred to No. 46 Group at RAF Broadwell. It was a tactical Dakota squadron and started training glider towing and parachute dropping. Its first operation in the new role was a leaflet drop on 17 April 1944 over France; this was followed by intensive flying in and out of France, including dropping parachutists at Arnhem. In fact, 512 Squadron can claim that they were the first planes over on D Day as 3 Dakotas piloted by Fl Lt Hyde, W.O. James Proctor and a C Flight Flying Officer dropped a specialist team at 00.02 on 6 June to try and disrupt the Merville Battery before the main assault.

Broadwell took part in the D-Day assaults alongside nearby RAF Down Ampney and RAF Blakehill Farm. On the eve of D-Day, No. 575 Squadron dropped 5 Para into the invasion drop zone. On 6 June, it towed 21 Horsa gliders into France. In the next few weeks it started a casualty evacuation service from France back to England. In September 1944, it was involved in operations at Arnhem where the squadron suffered severe casualties.

The airfield continued to be a terminus for long-range transport operations to Europe, the Middle East and India.

The following units were here at some point:
 No. 6 (RCAF) Casualty Air Evacuation Unit
 No. 10 Squadron RAF
 No. 21 Heavy Glider Conversion Unit RAF
 No. 76 Squadron RAF
 No. 77 Squadron RAF
 No. 91 (Forward) Staging Post
 No. 92 (Forward) Staging Post
 No. 94 (Forward) Staging Post
 No. 104 Terminal Staging Post
 No. 105 (Major) Staging Post
 No. 126 Staging Post
 No. 271 Squadron RAF
 No. 512 Squadron RAF
 No. 575 Squadron RAF
 No. 2792 Squadron RAF Regiment
 No. 2807 Squadron RAF Regiment

Current use

The site has returned to farmland and has a large solar farm covering it.

References

External links
 D-Day on the Cotswolds
 History at aeroresource.co.uk

Broadwell